The 1963 Northeastern Huskies football team represented Northeastern University during the 1963 NCAA College Division football season. It was the program's 28th season and they finished with an overall record of 8–1. After an undefeated regular season in which Northeastern went 8–0 and outscored their opponents 237 to 42, they were invited to their first (and program's only) bowl game – the Eastern Bowl, played in Allentown, Pennsylvania, where the Huskies lost to East Carolina 27–6. Their head coach was Joe Zabilski and their captain was All-American Joe Davis.

Schedule

References

Northeastern
Northeastern Huskies football seasons
Northeastern Football